Reading and Writing is an academic journal of the processes, acquisition, and loss of reading and writing skills. It is published by Springer Science+Business Media.

The editor is R. Malatesha Joshi (Texas A&M University).

External links

Print: 
Online: 

Springer Science+Business Media academic journals
Language education journals
Publications established in 1989
English-language journals